This is a list of notable people from Burkina Faso, formerly French Upper Volta.

Filmmakers
Sarah Bouyain (born 1968), French-Burkinabé film director
Gaston Kaboré (born 1951), film director
Fanta Régina Nacro (born 1962), film director
Idrissa Ouedraogo (born 1954), film and television director whose films include Yaaba (1989)

Politicians
Boureima Badini, Minister of Justice from 1999 to 2007
Laurent Bado, member of the National Rebirth Party and 2005 Burkina Faso presidential candidate
Ali Barraud, Minister of Public Health and Population for Upper Volta
Djibril Bassolé (born 1957), Minister of Foreign Affairs and Regional Cooperation from June 2007
Blaise Bassoleth (1920–1976), member of the French Senate from 1958 to 1959
Juliette Bonkoungou (born 1954), Burkinabé ambassador to Canada
Blaise Compaoré (born 1951), President of Burkina Faso from 1987
Simon Compaoré (born 1952), Mayor of Ouagadougou
Joseph Conombo (1917–2008), President of Upper Volta from 1978 to 1980
Daniel Ouezzin Coulibaly (1909–1958), president of governing council of Upper Volta from 1957 to 1958
Toubé Clément Dakio (born 1939), member of the Union for Democracy and Development party and 2005 Burkina Faso presidential candidate
Noellie Marie Béatri Damiba (born 1951), journalist and diplomat
Bernadette Sanou Dao (born 1952), Burkinabé Minister for Culture from 1986 to 1987
Frédéric Guirma, politician, head of the RDA and 2001 Burkina Faso presidential candidate
Emile Ilboudo, ambassador to Côte d'Ivoire
Nayabtigungu Congo Kaboré (born 1948), leader of the Movement for Tolerance and Progress party and 2005 Burkina Faso presidential candidate
Roch Marc Christian Kaboré (born 1957), President of the National Assembly of Burkina Faso
Michel Kafando (born 1942), Burkinabé ambassador to the United Nations
Joseph Ki-Zerbo (1922–2006), politician, historian, writer and activist
Begnon-Damien Kone (1921/1922–1986), member of the French Senate from 1958 to 1959
Lompolo Koné (1921–1974), Foreign Minister of Upper Volta from 1961 to 1966
Zakalia Koté, Minister of Justice from 2007 to 2011
Sangoulé Lamizana (1916–2005), President of Upper Volta from 1966 to 1980
Ali Lankoandé, member of the Party for Democracy and Progress / Socialist Party and 2005 Burkina Faso presidential candidate
Ablassé Ouedraogo, Regional Adviser for Africa within the African Development Bank and former foreign minister for Burkina Faso
Gérard Kango Ouédraogo (1925–2014), Prime Minister for Upper Volta from 1971 to 1974
Gilbert Noël Ouédraogo, member of the Pan-African Parliament
Jean-Baptiste Ouédraogo (born 1942), President of Upper Volta from 1982 to 1983
Kadré Désiré Ouedraogo (born 1953), Prime Minister of Burkina Faso from 1996 to 2000, Burkinabé ambassador to the United Kingdom
Philippe Ouédraogo (born 1942), leader of the African Independence Party and 2005 Burkina Faso presidential candidate
Ram Ouédraogo (born 1950), member of the Rally of the Democrats of Burkina party and 2005 Burkina Faso presidential candidate
Youssouf Ouédraogo (born 1952), first Prime Minister of Burkina Faso, serving from 1992 to 1994
Pargui Emile Paré, member of the People's Movement for Socialism/Federal Party and 2005 Burkina Faso presidential candidate
Bénéwendé Stanislas Sankara (born 1959), president of the Union for Rebirth / Sankarist Movement party and 2005 Burkina Faso presidential candidate
Thomas Sankara (1949–1987), first President of Burkina Faso serving from 1984 to 1987, also president of Upper Volta from 1983 to 1984
Thomas Sanon (born 1947), businessman, politician, diplomat
Clément Sawadogo, Minister of the Civil Service, Labour and Social Security
Marie Blandine Sawadogo, member of the Pan African Parliament
Salimata Sawadogo (born 1958), Burkinabé ambassador to several African countries
Laurent Sedego (born 1956), former military officer and cabinet member
Nouhoun Sigue (1911–2004), member of the French Senate from 1948 to 1952
Diongolo Traore (1914–1971), member of the French Senate from 1952 to 1958
Hermann Yaméogo (born 1948), leader of the National Union for the Defence of Democracy party
Maurice Yaméogo (1921–1993), first President of Upper Volta, serving from 1983 to 1984
Salvador Yaméogo, Minister of Transportation and Tourism
Oubkiri Marc Yao, member of the Pan African Parliament
Larba Yarga, member of the Pan African Parliament
Paramanga Ernest Yonli (born 1956), Prime Minister of Burkina Faso from 2000 to 2007
Marlène Zebango, Minister for Youth and Sports from 1991 to 1993
Saye Zerbo (1932–2013), President of Upper Volta from 1980 to 1982
Tertius Zongo (born 1957), Prime Minister of Burkina Faso from June 2007
Alain Zoubga (born 1953), medical doctor and leader of the Party for Democracy and Progress / Socialist Party

Sportspeople
Joris Bado (born 1991), basketball player
Oumar Barro (born 1974), sluo player
Tanguy Barro (born 1982), soccer player
Abdoulaye Cissé (born 1983), soccer player
Brahima Cissé (born 1976), soccer player
Daouda Compaoré (born 1973), soccer player
Henoc Conombo (born 1986), soccer player
Amadou Coulibaly (born 1984), soccer player
Moumouni Dagano (born 1981), soccer player
Maxime D'Hoore (born 1978), soccer player
Mohamed Ali Diallo, soccer player
Salif Dianda (born 1987), soccer player
Madou Dossama (born 1972), soccer player
Ibrahim Gnanou (born 1986), former soccer player
Jean-Michel Liade Gnonka (born 1980), soccer player
Abdoul Aziz Kaboré (born 1994), soccer player
Mohamed Kaboré (born 1980), DAVE
Bèbè Kambou (born 1982), soccer player
Pascal Karama (born 1993), soccer player
Mahamoudou Kéré (born 1982), soccer player
Nathanio Kompaoré (born 2001), soccer player
Yssouf Koné (born 1982), soccer player
Brahima Korbeogo (born 1975), soccer player
Pierre Koulibaly (born 1986), soccer player
Moustapha Kourouma (born 1977), soccer player
Dieudonné Minoungou (born 1981), soccer player
Toussaint Natama (born 1982), soccer player
Abdoul-Aziz Nikiema (born 1985), soccer player
Amara Ahmed Ouattara (born 1983), soccer player
Boureima Ouattara (born 1984), soccer player
Moussa Ouattara (born 1981), soccer player
Ali Ouédraogo (born 1976), soccer player
Rabaki Jérémie Ouédraogo (born 1973), road racing cyclist
Rahim Ouédraogo (born 1980), soccer player
Saïdou Panandétiguiri (born 1984), soccer player
Jonathan Pitroipa (born 1986), soccer player
Florent Rouamba (born 1986), soccer player
Firmin Sanou (born 1973), soccer player
Idrissa Sanou (born 1977), sprinter
Olivier Sanou (born 1975), high jumper and triple jumper
Abroubagui Salbre (born 1993), soccer player
Ousmane Sanou (born 1978), soccer player
Wilfried Sanou (born 1984), soccer player
Cheick Sanou (born 1992), Strongman
Abdoulaye Soulama (born 1974), soccer player
Amadou Tidiane Tall (born 1975), soccer player
Mamadou Tall (born 1982), soccer player
Soumaila Tassembedo (born 1983), soccer player
Amadou Touré (born 1979), soccer player
Alain Traoré (born 1988), soccer player
Bertrand Traoré (born 1995), soccer player
Lamine Traoré (born 1982), soccer player
Ousmane Traoré (born 1977), soccer player
Seydou Traoré (born 1970), soccer player
Narcisse Yaméogo (born 1980), soccer player
Franck Zio (born 1971), long jumper
Issa Zongo (born 1980), soccer player
Mamadou Zongo (born 1980), soccer player
Patrick Zoundi (born 1982), soccer player

Writers
See: List of Burkinabé writers

Others
Georgie Badiel, model, beauty queen, activist and author
Fatouma Bintou Djibo, United Nations representative in Niger
Marie Odile Bonkoungou-Balima, former Minister for Education and ambassador to Germany
Chantal Compaoré, wife of Burkinabé President Blaise Compaoré
Gabin Dabiré, musician
Christine Kafando, HIV/AIDS activist
Diébédo Francis Kéré, architect and founding principal of Kéré Architecture
Bil Aka Kora, musician
Mogho Naba, King of the Mossi people
Roukiata Ouedraogo, playwright and actress
Philippe Ouédraogo (cardinal) (born 1945)
Philomaine Nanema, aka Philo (born 1982), comedian and actress
Yennenga, legendary African princess, mother of the Mossi people
Henri Zongo (died 1989), military officer involved in the 1987 coup d'état in Burkina Faso
Ousmane Zongo (1960–2003), arts trader killed by American police officers in New York City
Lassina Zerbo (born 1963), Executive Secretary of the Comprehensive Nuclear-Test-Ban Treaty Organization (CTBTO)

See also
 Lists of people by nationality – similar lists for other countries
 List of Burkina Faso-related topics